Comet Howard–Koomen–Michels, formally known as C/1979 Q1 (SOLWIND), was a large sungrazer that collided with the Sun on August 30, 1979.  It is the only comet known to have made contact with the Sun's surface, as most bodies vaporize before impact.  It was observed by the white light coronagraph, SOLWIND, on the USAF Space Test Program, P78-1 satellite.  It was the first comet discovered by a space instrument.

Footnotes

External links 
 Gary W. Kronk's Cometography

Howard-Koomen-Michels